Ankarimbelo is a rural municipality in Madagascar. It belongs to the district of Ikongo, which is in the Fitovinany region. The municipality has a population of 1,995 in 2018.

Primary and junior level secondary education are available in town. The majority 97% of the population of the commune are farmers.  The most important crops are coffee and rice, while other important agricultural products are bananas and cassava. Services provide employment for 3% of the population.

Rivers
It is situated at the Matatana river, an affluent of the Matitanana.

References

Populated places in Fitovinany